Born to Race is a 1988 film directed by James Fargo. It stars Joseph Bottoms and Marla Heasley.

Plot
Al Pagura is a NASCAR driver who wants to win. He finds out that a beautiful Italian auto engineer is trying to sell her new engine. At the same time, rival team owner Vincent Dupalin kidnaps her so his driver Kenny Landruff can win. Al and his pit crew rescue her. In the last race at Charlotte, Landruff passes Al on the last lap and just when it seems he is going to win, his engine blows and he hits the wall. Al wins as Dupalin is arrested while Landruff is airlifted to the hospital.

Cast
Joseph Bottoms as Al Pagura
Marla Heasley as Andrea Lombardo
Robert Logan as Theo Jennings
George Kennedy as Vincent Duplain
Marc Singer as Kenny Landruff
Dirk Blocker as Bud
Michael McGrady as Walt
LaGena Hart as Jenny
Leon Rippy as Joel
Antonio Sabato Sr as Enrico Lombardo

References

External links
 

1988 films
Films directed by James Fargo
Films shot in North Carolina
1980s action drama films
American action drama films
American auto racing films
United Artists films
1980s English-language films
1980s American films